Mansion One is a 30-story skyscraper within the city of George Town in Penang, Malaysia. Located at Northam Road, the 30-story building contains 277 suites and 110 hotel rooms. Accommodation providers consist of Mansion One Suites and Vouk hotel rooms. In 2021, Mansion One Suites has rebranded to Merlene Suites at Mansion One The building has commercial spaces such as Starbucks and myNews outlets.

History 
Built in 1998, the skyscraper was originally named Northam Tower. It functioned as the Supreme Court of Penang between 2006 and 2011 when the original court building at Light Street underwent renovation works. Aside from the court, the structure also housed the regional offices of Samsung, EON Bank, and ING Insurance.

In 2011, the skyscraper was acquired by Magna Putih Sdn Bhd, a local private limited firm. The building was subsequently renovated into a hotel and renamed Mansion One.

See also 
List of tallest buildings in George Town
 Northam Road

References

External links 
 Mansion One
 Merlene Suites at Mansion One
 Vouk Hotel

Residential skyscrapers in Malaysia
Buildings and structures in George Town, Penang
1998 establishments in Malaysia
Buildings and structures completed in 1998
20th-century architecture in Malaysia